Ralph Brideoake,  (b Isleworth 19 May 1666 -  d Winchester 25 March 1743) was  an English priest in the 18th century.

He was the son of Ralph Brideoake, Bishop of Chichester. Brideoake was educated at New College, Oxford.

He held the livings at St Mary, Crawley, Hampshire and St Mary, Southampton. He was Archdeacon of Winchester from  1702 until his death.

Notes

1743 deaths
People from Isleworth
Archdeacons of Winchester (ancient)
Alumni of New College, Oxford
1666 births